Irish Creek flows into Schoharie Creek south of Fort Hunter, New York.

References

Rivers of New York (state)
Rivers of Montgomery County, New York